The Flora Tristán Peruvian Women's Center ( or CMP Flora Tristán) is a feminist non-governmental organization established in Lima in 1979 in defense of women's human rights and equality.

It has Consultative Status with the United Nations Economic and Social Council (ECOSOC).

The current executive director is sociologist Liz Meléndez.

History
CMP Flora Tristán has been connected with the advancement of women's rights in Peru since its founding in 1979. It was named in honor of French-Peruvian socialist writer and activist Flora Tristan. Its founders include the feminist sociologists Virginia Guzmán Barcos, and Virginia Vargas. The latter served as the organization's coordinator, and later as its director until 1990.

The jurist  was responsible for the legal assistance program for defense of victims of gender violence, including violence and sexual exploitation against minors. She was also the center's director from 1994 to 1996.

In 2004, on the occasion its 25th anniversary, the center organized the national seminar "25 Years of Feminism in Peru", analyzing the evolution of the feminist movement and creating a strategy for working to advance public policies.

Objectives
The organization develops strategies for research, training, advice, communication, legal and health services, as well as the dissemination of information. It conducts specialized training, in addition to promoting and participating in the formulation and negotiation of public policies to advance women's rights.

Among the programs it has developed are the Feminist Studies and Debate Program, research on femicides in Peru – in which the organization was a pioneer – the prevention of violence against women, and the empowerment of women in economic and political spaces.  It also promotes the campaign to prevent, punish and eradicate political harassment against women.

International presence
 Consultative Status with the United Nations Economic and Social Council (ECOSOC)
 28 September Campaign,

Awards and recognition
 2021: Order Emeritus to the Women of the Bicentennial, awarded by the Peruvian government's Ministry of Women and Vulnerable Populations

Notable people
 María Emma Mannarelli, feminist writer, historian, professor, researcher

Selected publications

References

External links
  

Organizations established in 1979
1979 establishments in Peru
Women's rights in Peru
Women's rights organizations
Feminist organizations in Peru